Kayerkan, located in the northern part of Krasnoyarsk Krai, Russia and in the southern part of the Taymyr Peninsula, was a town under jurisdiction of Norilsk in 1982–2005. In 2005, the town was incorporated into Norilsk, even though it is located 20 km away from its center. Population: 27,116 (2002 Census); 27,881 (1989 Census).

History 
The settlement of Kayerkan was established in 1943 in relation with coal mining in the area. It was granted status of work settlement in 1957, and that of a town in 1982.

Population

References 

Geography of Krasnoyarsk Krai
Former cities in Russia